Events from the year 1936 in Sweden

Incumbents
 Monarch – Gustaf V
 Prime Minister – Per Albin Hansson, Axel Pehrsson-Bramstorp

Events
In October of this year, the Mästermyr chest is accidentally discovered in the Mästermyr mire (after which it is later named), west of Hemse on the island of Gotland, Sweden. It will prove to be the largest tool find from that era in Europe.

Popular culture

Literature 
 Katrina, novel by Sally Salminen

Film 
 23 March – The comedy film Kungen kommer released in Sweden.

Sports 
 World All-Round Speed Skating Championships for Women held in Stockholm
 Svenska Badmintonförbundet established 
 The 1936 Swedish Ice Hockey Championship was won by Hammarby IF

Births
 17 May – Lars Gustafsson, poet, novelist and scholar
 22 July – John Albrechtson, sailor (died 1985).

Deaths

 8 February – Elma Danielsson, Social Democrat, journalist and feminist  (born 1865)
 13 March – Gunnar Höjer, gymnast (born 1875).
 31 August – Gustav Almgren, fencer (born 1906).
 9 December –  Arvid Lindman, rear admiral, industrialist and conservative politician (born 1862)

Exact date missing 
 Sven Scholander, singer, musician, composer and sculptor (born 1860)
 Sigrid Björkegren, entrepreneur (born 1845)

References

 
Sweden
Years of the 20th century in Sweden